Solomon Scheu (January 6, 1822  – November 23, 1888) was an American businessman and politician from New York.

Life
He came to the United States in 1839 to live with an uncle and a brother in New York City, and learned the baker's trade. In 1844, he removed to Buffalo, New York, where his brother Jacob lived. They opened a bakery, later a grocery business, and then a malt factory. In 1847, he married Wilhelmina Rink, and they had seven sons and a daughter.
   
He entered politics as a Democrat, and was alderman from the Sixth Ward in 1854 and 1855. He was Receiver of Taxes from 1856 to 1859. He was an Alderman again in 1866 and 1867.

He was an Inspector of State Prisons from 1868 to 1873, elected in 1867 and 1870.

In November 1877, he was elected Mayor of Buffalo by a slim margin in a three-way race, defeating the incumbent Republican Philip Becker (vote: Scheu 8,756; Becker 8,159; Edward Bennett, Tax Payers Party, 6,216). He was in office from January 7, 1878, to January 1880, but was defeated for re-election in 1879 by Alexander Brush (vote: Brush 13,721; Scheu 12,189). In 1887, he ran again for Mayor but was defeated by the incumbent Philip Becker (vote: Becker 17,925; Scheu 17,451).

He died of "paralysis", and was buried at the Forest Lawn Cemetery, Buffalo.

His son Solomon Scheu (1850–1895) was also an alderman of Buffalo.

See also
German American

Sources
 The Mayors of Buffalo, at The Buffalonian
 Death notice of his son, in NYT on March 28, 1895

1822 births
1888 deaths
New York State Prison Inspectors
Mayors of Buffalo, New York
Bavarian emigrants to the United States
Burials at Forest Lawn Cemetery (Buffalo)
People from the Kingdom of Bavaria
New York (state) Democrats
19th-century American politicians